Bichun may refer to:
Bichun-e Pain